Flix is a town in Catalonia, Spain. 

Flix may also refer to:


Computing
 Flix (programming language), a functional programming language
 South Florida Internet Exchange (FL-IX)
 Flix, a video encoding and publishing software from On2 Technologies

Entertainment
 Flix (TV network), a subscription television channel owned by Showtime
 Trix & Flix, official mascots for UEFA Euro 2008

Other uses
 Flix Miranda, electrical engineer
 a slang term for films, an alternate spelling of "flicks"

See also